The Rakamonie EP is an EP by Swedish pop singer Robyn. It was released by Konichiwa Records on 26 November 2006 in Europe prior to the United Kingdom release of her fourth album Robyn (2007). It was released in the United States with a slightly altered track list, which includes an acoustic version of the #1 UK single "With Every Heartbeat". It was Robyn's first domestic release in United States in over ten years.

Track listing
UK
"Konichiwa Bitches" (with "Tomteverkstan" intro) – 3:03
"Cobrastyle" (Teddybears cover) – 4:10
"List of Demands" (Saul Williams cover) (live with Jenny Wilson) – 2:52
"Be Mine!" (ballad version) – 4:08
"Jack U Off" (Prince cover) – 2:15

US
"Konichiwa Bitches" (with "Tomteverkstan" intro) – 3:03
"Cobrastyle" (Teddybears cover) – 4:10
"Be Mine!" (ballad version) – 4:08
"With Every Heartbeat" (acoustic version) – 3:32
"Jack U Off" (Prince cover) – 2:15

Personnel
The following people contributed to The Rakamonie EP:
Robyn – lead vocals, mixing, photography
Klas Åhlund – mixing, string arrangements
Jenny Wilson – vocals
Michael Ilbert, Linus Larsson, Henrik, Ollie – mixing
Frippe Jonsäter, Ljunligan – sound effects
Mary Fagot for Outfit – art direction
Blake E. Marquis – art design

Notes

2006 debut EPs
Robyn albums
Cherrytree Records albums
Interscope Records EPs